Gobiesox is a genus of clingfishes found in the Americas, including offshore islands. These seven are the only known freshwater clingfish.

The genus includes both widespread and common species, and more restricted species that are virtually unknown. Three freshwater species that are endemic to Mexico (G. fluviatilis, G. juniperoserrai and G. mexicanus) are considered threatened by Mexican authorities, and three species that are endemic to small offshore islands (G  aethus and G. canidens of the Revillagigedo Islands, and G. woodsi of Cocos Island) are considered vulnerable by the IUCN.

Species

There are currently 30 recognized species in this genus. However, genetic studies have shown that Pherallodiscus should be merged into Gobiesox (adding two species to Gobiesox).

 Gobiesox adustus D. S. Jordan & C. H. Gilbert, 1882 (Panamic clingfish)
 Gobiesox aethus (Briggs, 1951) (Clarion clingfish)
 Gobiesox barbatulus Starks, 1913 (Lappet-lip clingfish)
 Gobiesox canidens (Briggs, 1951) (Socorro clingfish)
 Gobiesox cephalus Lacépède, 1800
 Gobiesox crassicorpus (Briggs, 1951)
 Gobiesox daedaleus Briggs, 1951
 Gobiesox eugrammus Briggs, 1955 (Lined clingfish)
 Gobiesox fluviatilis Briggs & R. R. Miller, 1960 (Mountain clingfish)
 Gobiesox fulvus Meek, 1907
 Gobiesox juniperoserrai Espinosa-Pérez & Castro-Aguirre, 1996 (Peninsular clingfish)
 Gobiesox juradoensis Fowler, 1944
 Gobiesox lanceolatus Hastings & Conway, 2017 (Canyon clingfish)
 Gobiesox lucayanus Briggs, 1963 (Bahama clingfish)
 Gobiesox maeandricus (Girard, 1858) (Northern clingfish)
 Gobiesox marijeanae Briggs, 1960 (Lonely clingfish)
 Gobiesox marmoratus L. Jenyns, 1842
 Gobiesox mexicanus Briggs & R. R. Miller, 1960 (Mexican clingfish)
 Gobiesox milleri Briggs, 1955
 Gobiesox multitentaculus (Briggs, 1951)
 Gobiesox nigripinnis (W. K. H. Peters, 1859) (Black-finned clingfish)
 Gobiesox papillifer C. H. Gilbert, 1890 (Bearded clingfish)
 Gobiesox pinniger C. H. Gilbert, 1890
 Gobiesox potamius Briggs, 1955
 Gobiesox punctulatus (Poey, 1876) (Stippled clingfish)
 Gobiesox rhessodon R. S. Eigenmann, 1881 (California clingfish)
 Gobiesox schultzi Briggs, 1951 (Smooth-lip clingfish)
 Gobiesox stenocephalus Briggs, 1955
 Gobiesox strumosus Cope, 1870 
 Gobiesox woodsi (L. P. Schultz, 1944) (Woods' clingfish)

References

 
Gobiesocidae
Freshwater fish genera
Marine fish genera
Taxa named by Bernard Germain de Lacépède